The Hotel California 2020 Tour (also known as the Hotel California 2021 Tour and Hotel California 2022 Tour) is a concert tour by American rock band Eagles commemorating their 1976 album, Hotel California. The tour began on 7 February 2020, in Atlanta, at the State Farm Arena, after three Las Vegas concerts in September 2019 received rave reviews and more dates were announced.

Background
The band performed the 1976 Grammy-winning album from "beginning to end." "Each night's concert will feature a 'Hotel California' set, with an accompanying orchestra and choir, followed by an additional set of the band's greatest hits," the band's website said. The setlist for the two shows performed in Las Vegas in September 2019 was one of the longest setlists the band had ever played, each show lasting for approximately three hours. The setlist remained the same for the 2020 leg of dates, but the setlists varied slightly in length for the 2021 and 2022 dates.

The band performed with an orchestra accompaniment at each show for select songs. The orchestra comprised both local and touring musicians, and was conducted by Jim Ed Norman, who wrote the original orchestrations for the Hotel California album.

The first two legs featured Deacon Frey and country artist Vince Gill since they joined the band in 2017 after the death of founding member Glenn Frey in 2016.

On March 21, 2020, the band announced the postponement of their North American tour due to the COVID-19 pandemic. On May 1, 2020, band announced the tour would be further postponed to 2021 due to continuing concerns related to the COVID-19 pandemic.

It was announced on February 17, 2022 that Deacon Frey would not be participating in the upcoming leg of the “Hotel California” tour due to an unspecified illness. The band subsequently announced on April 6, 2022 that Frey would be leaving the group for a solo career.

Setlist

2020

"Hotel California"
"New Kid in Town"
"Life in the Fast Lane"
"Wasted Time" (contains reprise)
"Victim of Love"
"Pretty Maids All in a Row"
"Try and Love Again"
"The Last Resort"

Intermission

"Seven Bridges Road"
"Take It Easy"
"One of These Nights"
"Take It to the Limit"
"Tequila Sunrise"
"Witchy Woman"
"In the City"
"I Can't Tell You Why"
"Lyin' Eyes"
"Best of My Love"
"Peaceful Easy Feeling"
"Love Will Keep Us Alive"
"Walk Away"
"Those Shoes"
"Life's Been Good"
"The Boys of Summer"
"Funk #49"
"Already Gone"
"Heartache Tonight"

Encore
"Rocky Mountain Way"
 "Desperado"
"The Long Run"
"Hotel California" (Reprise)

2021
Show in San Francisco at Chase Center Oct 22/23. May not represent all shows.
"Hotel California"
"New Kid in Town"
"Life in the Fast Lane"
"Wasted Time" (contains reprise)
"Victim of Love"
"Pretty Maids All in a Row"
"Try and Love Again"
"The Last Resort"
Intermission
"Seven Bridges Road"
"Take it Easy"
"One of These Nights"
"Take It to the Limit"
"Lyin' Eyes"
"Witchy Woman"
"In the City"
"I Can't Tell You Why"
"Peaceful Easy Feeling"
"Tequila Sunrise"
"Those Shoes"
"Life's Been Good"
"Already Gone"
"Funk #49"
"Heartache Tonight"
Encore
"Rocky Mountain Way"
"Desperado"
"The Boys of Summer"
"Best of My Love"

Shows

Notes

Band members

Eagles

Don Henley – vocals, drums, guitar, percussion
Joe Walsh – vocals, guitar, keyboards
Timothy B. Schmit – bass guitar, vocals
With
Deacon Frey – vocals, guitar (until 2022)
Vince Gill – vocals, guitar

Additional musicians

Michael Thompson – piano, keyboards, accordion, backing vocals 
Will Hollis – keyboards, organ, backing vocals  
Scott Crago – drums, percussion
Steuart Smith – guitars, backing vocals

References

2020 concert tours
Eagles (band)
Concert tours postponed due to the COVID-19 pandemic
2019 concert tours
2021 concert tours
2022 concert tours
2023 concert tours